Beaumont Charlton-Pollard High School was a senior high school in Beaumont, Texas, a part of the Beaumont Independent School District, that operated from 1975 to 1986. The mascot was the cougar and its school colors were green and gold.

It was established from the merger of Beaumont High School, the high school for white students, and Charlton-Pollard High School, the high school for black students. The merger happened after Joe J. Fisher, a U.S. federal district court judge, ordered Beaumont ISD to speedily desegregate. In 1986 the school consolidated with French High School to form Beaumont Central High School.

References

Beaumont Independent School District high schools
1975 establishments in Texas
Educational institutions established in 1975
1986 disestablishments in Texas
Educational institutions disestablished in 1986